Giovanna Schettino (born 26 February 1998) is an Italian lightweight rower world champion at senior level at the World Rowing Championships.

Biography
Schettino started the activity in 2012, having her senior debut in 2017. In addition to the international medal won at a senior level, at the youth level she won four more medals between world and European championships.

Achievements

References

External links
 

1998 births
Living people
Italian female rowers
World Rowing Championships medalists for Italy